Sudirman Hadi (born 9 March 1996) is a sprinter from Indonesia. He competed in the 100 m event at the 2016 Summer Olympics and qualified to the main heat by finishing second in his preliminary heat. He then finished last in his heat, with a time of 10.70.

References

1996 births
Living people
Indonesian male sprinters
Olympic athletes of Indonesia
Athletes (track and field) at the 2016 Summer Olympics
Sportspeople from West Nusa Tenggara
21st-century Indonesian people